All municipalities in the Canadian province of Ontario held elections on November 13, 1978, to elect mayors or reeves, councillors, school trustees, and (in some areas) public utilities commissioners. Some municipalities also held referendums on various issues.

The most closely watched contest was in Toronto, where John Sewell was elected as mayor.

Results

Brantford

1978 elections in Canada
Municipal elections in Ontario
1978 in Ontario